Baroness Masham may refer to:

 Abigail Masham, Baroness Masham ( – 1734), English courtier and royal favourite
 Susan Cunliffe-Lister, Baroness Masham of Ilton (1935–2023), British life peer and disability campaigner

See also 
 Baron Masham, a title in the Peerage of the United Kingdom
 Damaris, Lady Masham (1659–1708), English philosopher and theologian